2014–15 Hong Kong Premier League (also known as BOCG Life Hong Kong Premier League for sponsorship reasons) is the first season of Hong Kong Premier League, the top division of Hong Kong football. The fixtures were announced on 15 August 2014. The season began on 12 September 2014 and concluded on 9 May 2015.

Teams 
A total of 9 teams will contest the league, including seven sides from the 2013–14 Hong Kong First Division League and two promoted from the 2013–14 Hong Kong Second Division.

Stadia and locations 
Note: Table lists in alphabetical order.

Personnel and kits

Chairman changes

Managerial changes

Foreign players
The number of foreign players is restricted to six (including an Asian player) per team, with no more than four on pitch during matches.

League table

Results

Fixtures and results

Round 1

Round 2

Round 3

Round 4

Round 5

Round 6

Round 7

Round 8

Round 9

Round 10

Round 11

Round 12

Round 13

Round 14

Round 15

Round 16

Round 17

Round 18

Attendances

Hong Kong Top Footballer Awards

References 

Hong Kong Premier League seasons
1
Hong Kong